Odontellidae is a family of springtails in the order Poduromorpha. There are about 9 genera and more than 50 described species in Odontellidae.

Genera
These nine genera belong to the family Odontellidae:
 Austrodontella Ellis & Bellinger, 1973
 Axenyllodes Stach, 1949
 Odontella Schäffer, 1897
 Odontellina Deharveng, 1981
 Pseudostachia Arlé, 1968
 Pseudoxenyllodes Kuznetsova & Potapov, 1988
 Stachia Folsom, 1932
 Superodontella
 Xenyllodes Axelson, 1903

References

Further reading

External links

 

Collembola
Articles created by Qbugbot
Arthropod families